Pseudhammus congoanus is a species of beetle in the family Cerambycidae. It was described by Duvivier in 1891.

References

congoanus
Beetles described in 1891